Ekin Tunçay Turan (born Ekin Tunçay), is a Turkish actress and translator. She has been working in Turkish State Theatre since 1993.

Biography
Turan attended high school in Ankara, where she began to act. While still a student, she appeared on Turkish Radio Television in various TV series. She graduated in 1992 from the Ankara Conservatory Theatre Department of Hacettepe University. In 1993, she joined Trabzon State Theatre. Seven years later, she was engaged by the Ankara State Theatre. She appeared in the television series "Blood Wedding" and "The Fake Princess" in 2005–2006.

Turan started translating plays and TV films from English to Turkish in the year 2005. She is also currently working with TRT, translating various films and documentaries.

In 2007, she took a course on camera acting from New York Film Academy in Los Angeles. The following year, Turkish State Theatre in Ankara released her for six months to appear with the Open Fist Theatre in Los Angeles and to study and conduct research. During this period, she took part in various projects and events of the Open Fist Theatre. Some of the workshops she attended include "Mask Making", "Suzuki and Viewpoints" organised by New York-based SITI Company and Eric Morris's acting course. She also took private lessons in Joanne Baron / D.W. Brown Acting Studio and in Susan Batson's Black Nexxus and received on-camera training from Batson's son Carl Ford.

She is currently working as an actress in Ankara State Theatres.

Stage performances
 The Woman in Black: Susan Hill / Stephen Mallatratt – Ankara State Theatre
 The Winter’s Tale: William Shakespeare – Ankara State Theatre
 Jake's Women: Neil Simon – Ankara State Theatre 
 Dog Woman Man: Sibylle Berg – Ankara State Theatre 
 Love Is Far From Here: Özen Yula – Ankara State Theatre
 Komşu Köyün Delisi: Üstün Dökmen – Ankara State Theatre
 Bir Varmış İki de Varmış: Ali Meriç – Ankara State Theatre 
 Ah, Wilderness: Eugene O'Neill – Ankara State Theatre 
 King Richard III: William Shakespeare – Ankara State Theatre
 The Prisoner of Second Avenue: Neil Simon – Trabzon State Theatre 
 Fermanlı Deli Hazretleri: Müsahipzade Celâl – Trabzon State Theatre 
 Çok Yaşa Sağlık: Volker Ludwig & Christian Veit – Trabzon State Theatre 
 The Crafty Wife Of The Silly Husband: Haldun Taner – Trabzon State Theatre 
 Hurmuz With Seven Husbands: Sadık Şendil – Trabzon State Theatre 
 Tartuffe: Molière – Trabzon State Theatre 
 Yaşasın Gökkuşağı: Ülkü Ayvaz – Trabzon State Theatre 
 The Condolence: Murathan Mungan – Trabzon State Theatre 
 Legend Of Kesanlı Ali: Haldun Taner – Trabzon State Theatre 
 Master Of Istanbul: Müsahipzade Celâl – Trabzon State Theatre 
 The Merchant Of Venice: William Shakespeare – Trabzon State Theatre 
 How Would Asiye Be Saved ?: Vasıf Öngören – Trabzon State Theatre

Translated plays 
 Mosquitoes: Sivrisinekler: Lucy Kirkwood – 2021
 Holmes And Watson: Holmes Ve Watson: Jeffrey Hatcher – 2020
 The Girl On The Train: Trendeki Kız: Paula Hawkins / Rachel Wagstaff & Duncan Abel – 2019
 Mom, Dad And A Bad Idea: Anne, Baba Ve Kötü Bir Fikir: Sam Bobrick & Joey Bobrick – 2019
 Quietly: Sessizce: Owen McCafferty – 2019
 The Children: Çocuklar: Lucy Kirkwood – 2018
 It's Only Murder: Sırf Cinayet: Sam Bobrick – 2018
 Murder At The Howard Johnson's: Otelde Cinayet: Sam Bobrick & Ron Clark – 2018
 Goodbye Letters: Veda Mektupları: Sam Bobrick – 2018
 Things I Know To Be True: Doğru Bildiğim Şeyler: Andrew Bovell – 2018
 Waiting For Waiting For Godot: Godot'yu Beklerken'i Beklerken: Dave Hanson – 2017
 Johnny Got His Gun: Johnny Askere Gitti: Dalton Trumbo / Bradley Rand Smith – 2016
 Welcome To My Head: Aklıma Hoş Geldiniz: Sam Bobrick – 2016
 The Humans: İnsanlar: Stephen Karam – 2016
 Hangmen: Cellâtlar: Martin McDonagh – 2016
 The Flick: Sinema: Annie Baker – 2016
 The Other Place: Öteki Yer: Sharr White – 2014
 Lunch With Mrs. Baskin: Bayan Baskin'le Öğle Yemeği: Sam Bobrick – 2014
 Bang! You're Dead!: Bam! Sen Öldün!: Lori Donner – 2014
 Curiosity Cat: Meraklı Kedi: Chris Grabenstein – 2014
 Scenes From A Separation: Bir Ayrılıktan Sahneler: Andrew Bovell & Hannie Rayson – 2013
 Last Lists of My Mad Mother: Annemin Son Çılgınlıkları: Julie Jensen – 2012
 Collaborators: İşbirlikçiler: John Hodge – 2012
 Kafka's Monkey: Kafka'nın Maymunu: Franz Kafka / Colin Teevan – 2012
 A Behanding in Spokane: Kayıp El "Spokane'de El(e)veda": Martin McDonagh – 2012
 Alice in Wonderland: Alice Harikalar Diyarında: Lewis Carroll / Tim Kane – 2012
 Freud's Last Session: Freud'un Son Seansı: Mark St. Germain – 2011
 Shrek: The Musical: Shrek Müzikali: David Lindsay-Abaire – 2011
 Faith, Hope and Charity: İnanç, Umut Ve İyilik: Ödön von Horváth – 2011
 Judgment Day: Hesap Günü: Ödön von Horváth – 2011
 Speaking in Tongues: Anlaşılmaz Konuşmalar: Andrew Bovell – 2011
 Reader: Sansürcü: Ariel Dorfman – 2010
 Two Single People: İki Bekâr: Sam Bobrick – 2010
 Travis Pine (A Man of the People): Halktan Biri (Travis Pine): Sam Bobrick – 2010
 Leading Ladies: Başroldeki Kadınlar: Ken Ludwig – 2010
 How to Explain the History of Communism to Mental Patients: Akıl Hastalarına Komünizmin Tarihi Nasıl Anlatılır ?: Matei Visniec – 2010
 A Second of Pleasure: Bir Mutluluk Ânı: Neil LaBute – 2010
 Land of the Dead: Ölüler Diyarı: Neil LaBute – 2010
 Fuddy Meers (Funny Mirrors): Konik Annalar (Komik Aynalar): David Lindsay-Abaire – 2010
 In the Rest Room at Rosenblooms: Rosenblooms'da Bir Gün: Ludmilla Bollow – 2009
 Helter Skelter: Karmakarışık: Neil LaBute – 2009
 33 Variations: 33 Varyasyon: Moisés Kaufman – 2009
 Half and Half: Yarı Yarıya: James Sherman – 2009
 Cookin' With Gus: Gus İle Yemek Saati: Jim Brochu – 2009
 Tuesdays With Morrie: Morrie İle Her Salı: Jeffrey Hatcher & Mitch Albom – 2009
 Books : Kitaplar: Stuart M. Kaminsky – 2009
 Passengers: Yolcular: Sam Bobrick – 2009
 Baggage: Bavul: Sam Bobrick – 2009
 Still Life: Yine de Yaşamak: Alexander Dinelaris – 2008
 The Chaos Theories: Kaos Teorileri: Alexander Dinelaris – 2008
 Annoyance: Baş Belâsı: Sam Bobrick – 2007
 Kiss Me Like You Mean It: Beni Gerçekten Öp: Chris Chibnall – 2005

 TV series 
 Sahte Prenses: Show TV – 2006  (The Fake Princess)  Photos
 Kanlı Düğün'': Show TV – 2005  (Blood Wedding)         Photos

References

External links
 Ekin TUNÇAY TURAN personal website   
 Turkish state theatre official website of the directorate 
 Onk agency's official website 
  
  
  
  
  
  

Turkish actresses
Turkish stage actresses
Turkish translators
Living people
People from Ankara
Hacettepe University Ankara State Conservatory alumni
Year of birth missing (living people)